Ilex rugosa, the tsuru holly, is a species of flowering plant in the family Aquifoliaceae, native to southern Khabarovsk Krai, Sakhalin, and the Kuril Islands in Russia, and to eight mountain summits in Japan. It is usually quite prostrate (growing ever lower with increasing altitude) and does well in areas with protective winter snow cover to prevent damage from late frosts.

Because of its cold-hardiness, Kathleen Meserve crossed it with Ilex aquifolium (common holly) and produced hybrids dubbed the "blue hollies" and later given the scientific name Ilex ×meserveae. Two of these hybrid shrubs, sold as clones, have gained the Royal Horticultural Society's Award of Garden Merit. 'Conapri' (trade name ) is female and produces masses of berries without need of a male. 'Conablu' (trade name ) is male and grows a bit taller than 'Conapri', perhaps  at maturity.

References

rugosa
Flora of Khabarovsk Krai
Flora of Sakhalin
Flora of the Kuril Islands
Flora of Japan
Plants described in 1868